Oncideres repandator is a species of beetle in the family Cerambycidae. It was described by Johan Christian Fabricius in 1792. It is known from French Guiana, Suriname, Brazil and Guyana. It feeds on Mangifera indica.

References

repandator
Beetles described in 1792